The New York City Police Department Counterterrorism Bureau (CT) is a division of the New York City Police Department (NYPD) responsible for preventing terrorist attacks within New York City. Former New York City Police Commissioner Raymond Kelly described the CT as "a Council on Foreign Relations with guns".

The counterterrorism and intelligence bureaus fall under the domain of Intelligence and Counterterrorism Division, which is commanded by Deputy Commissioner John Miller.

Current subdivisions

Critical Response Command (CRC) 
Critical Response Command (CRC) is one of the Department's first lines of defense against a terrorist-related attack. A permanent cadre of hand-selected police officers devoted to counterterrorism, CRC members are trained to respond swiftly, with sufficient expertise and force, to the most highly organized and heavily armed attacks. All CRC team members are trained in special weapons and long-range guns, explosive trace detection, radiological and nuclear awareness, biological and chemical weapons awareness, and are equipped with the skills to detect an impending attack and utilize the best possible response to an emerging situation. The team conducts daily counterterrorism deployments to critical infrastructure sites throughout New York City, saturating strategic locations with a uniform presence to disrupt and deter terrorist planning and hostile surveillance operations.

Counterterrorism Division 
The counterterrorism division oversees a range of activities including:

 The Technology and Construction Section which designs counterterrorism projects.
 The Training Section which provides counterterrorism training.
 The Threat Reduction Infrastructure Protection Section (TRIPS)  which develops specific defensive strategies for various locations in the city.
 The Chemical, Biological, Radiological, Nuclear, and Explosives (CBRNE) Section which conducts tests and research on new counterterrorism technologies.
 The Maritime Team, which designs counterterrorism systems for the city's harbors, this includes the Tactical Radiological Acquisition Characterization System (TRACS) which maps background radiation.
 The NYPD SHIELD Unit which provides information and training to the public on counterterrorism.
 The Emergency Preparedness and Exercise Section, which liaises with the NYC Office of Emergency Management.

Joint terrorist task force (JTTF) 

The JTTF is a national security force which includes both members of the NYPD and the FBI, and operates both within New York City and globally. This partnership allows nationally classified documents to be used by the NYPD, and for local information to be shared at the national level.

Domain awareness system (DAS)

Lower Manhattan security initiative (LMSI)

Terrorism threat analysis group 
The Terrorism Threat Analysis Group is responsible for the analysis and sharing of intelligence to various agencies including other police departments.

World Trade Center command 
The World Trade Center command provides security around the World Trade Center.

See also 

 Police surveillance in New York City
 New York City Police Department Intelligence Bureau
 Organization of the New York City Police Department

References 

Law enforcement in the New York metropolitan area
Counterterrorism